Tre is a given name.

Notable people with the name include

A
Tré Armstrong (born 1978), Canadian actress
Tre Arrow (born 1974), American environmental activist
Tre Avery (born 1997), American football player

B
Tre Barry (born 1996), Bahamian footballer
Tre Boston (born 1992), American football player
Tre Brown (born 1997), American football player
Tre Bussey (born 1991), American basketball player

C
Tre Capital (born 1995), American recording artist
Tré Cool (born 1972), American musician

D
Tre Demps (born 1993), American basketball player

F
Tre Flowers (born 1995), American football player
Tre Ford (born 1998), Canadian football player

H
Tre Harbison (born 1998), American football player
Tre Hargett (born 1969), American politician
Tre Herndon (born 1996), American football player

J
Tre' Jackson (born 1992), American football player
Tre Jean-Marie (born 1993), British songwriter
Tre' Johnson (born 1971), American football player
Tre Jones (born 2000), American basketball player

K
Tre Kelley (born 1985), American basketball player
Tre King, American football player

L
Tre Lamar (born 1997), American football player
Tre Lamb (born 1989), American football coach and player

M
Tre Madden (born 1993), American football player
Tre Manchester (born 1992), American writer
Tre Manders (born 1995), Bermudian cricketer
Tre Mann (born 2001), American basketball player
Tre Mason (born 1993), American football player
Tre McBride (born 1992), American football player
Tre' McKitty (born 1999), American football player
Tre McLean (born 1993), American basketball player
Tre Ming (born 1993), Bermudian footballer
Tre Mission, Canadian musician
Tre Mitchell (born 2000), American football player
Tré Mitford (born 1994), Guyanese footballer

N
Tre Nagella, American recording engineer
Tre' Newton (born 1989), American football player
Tre Nixon (born 1998), American football player
Tre Norwood (born 1999), American football player

R
Tre Roberson (born 1992), American football player

S
Tre Simmons (born 1982), American basketball player
Tre Smith (disambiguation), multiple people
Tre' Stallings (born 1983), American football player
Tre Sullivan (born 1994), American football player

T
Tre Thomas (born 1975), American football player
Tré Turner (born 2000), American football player

V
Tre Van Die Kasie (born 1981), Namibian musician and rapper

W
Tre Whyte (born 1993), British cyclist
Tre Williams (born 1971), American singer

See also
Trae, people with the given name "Trae"
Trey (given name), people with the given name "Trey"